Zicca is a genus of leaf-footed bugs in the family Coreidae. There are about 19 described species in Zicca.

Species
These 19 species belong to the genus Zicca:

 Zicca acetabularia Brailovsky & Cadena, 1992
 Zicca annulata (Burmeister, 1835)
 Zicca commaculata Distant, 1881
 Zicca consobrina Stål, 1860
 Zicca cornuta Stål, 1860
 Zicca erratica Brailovsky & Cadena, 1992
 Zicca gigas Brailovsky & Cadena, 1992
 Zicca impicta Blöte, 1935
 Zicca inornata Breddin, 1902
 Zicca nigropunctata (De Geer, 1773)
 Zicca pacificae Brailovsky & Cadena, 1992
 Zicca paramerana Brailovsky & Cadena, 1992
 Zicca pronotata Brailovsky & Cadena, 1992
 Zicca pulchra (Stål, 1855)
 Zicca rubricator (Fabricius, 1803)
 Zicca signoreti Lethierry & Severin, 1894
 Zicca spurca Brailovsky & Cadena, 1992
 Zicca stali Berg, 1879
 Zicca taeniola (Dallas, 1852)

References

Further reading

External links

 

Articles created by Qbugbot
Coreini
Coreidae genera